Gordon McQueen (born 26 June 1952) is a Scottish former professional footballer who played as a centre-back for St Mirren, Leeds United and Manchester United. McQueen also represented Scotland.

Playing career

Club
McQueen was a goalkeeper as a schoolboy but later switched to centre-back. He was signed at the age of 18 by St Mirren. He soon had scouts from other clubs monitoring his progress and it was Leeds United who finally offered £30,000 in the 1972 close season, seeing him as a long-term replacement for the ageing Jack Charlton. Charlton played for some of the 1972–73 season but had decided to retire as the season was drawing to a close. McQueen played on six occasions in his first season at Leeds but missed out on the 1973 FA Cup Final, with manager Don Revie instead opting for the experience of utility player Paul Madeley.

With Charlton retired and Madeley playing in many positions, McQueen was in the team for most of the 1973–74 season. Leeds won the League Championship, with a run of 29 matches without a defeat from the start of the season with McQueen playing a key part alongside Norman Hunter as Leeds' first-choice centre back pairing. 

McQueen and Hunter excelled at the back the following season, notably in Leeds' campaign in the European Cup, during which McQueen scored three goals. He was suspended for the 1975 European Cup Final, after being sent off in the semi-final versus Barcelona. Leeds went on to lose 2–0 in the final versus Bayern Munich.

In February 1978, McQueen moved from Leeds to their arch-rivals Manchester United for £500,000. On signing, he said that "99% of players want to play for Manchester United and the rest are liars." He had declared only weeks earlier in Shoot magazine that he wanted to stay at Elland Road for his entire career. He played in the 1979 FA Cup Final, scoring United's first of two goals in the 86th minute.

McQueen finally gained an FA Cup winner's medal in the 1983 FA Cup Final after a replay versus Brighton & Hove Albion. He was also in the team that was defeated in the 1983 Football League Cup Final versus Liverpool that same season. He finally left Old Trafford in the 1985 close season, after losing his first-team place to Paul McGrath and not being included in the 1985 FA Cup Final team that defeated Everton 1–0.

International
At the end of the 1973–74 season McQueen was called up to the Scotland squad and made his international debut versus Belgium. A year later he had become a regular for the national team; he was selected for the 1978 FIFA World Cup squad for Argentina, although he could not play due to injury. He played his last match for Scotland in 1981, gaining 30 caps and scoring five goals, including two in the space of four days against Northern Ireland at Hampden Park then England at Wembley as the Scots claimed the 1976–77 British Home Championship.

Post playing career
McQueen coached abroad before he was the manager of Airdrieonians for a short spell, before coaching at his first club St Mirren. When McQueen's friend and former team-mate Bryan Robson was appointed the manager of Middlesbrough, McQueen joined him as reserve-team coach. He held this position for five years, and was then a first-team coach for two years. McQueen left the Teesside club in June 2001, following the departure of Robson and the appointment of Steve McClaren. McQueen then joined Sky Sports as a pundit.

On 29 April 2008, McQueen had returned to Boro as assistant scout, alongside  David Mills.

Personal life
Since coaching Middlesbrough, McQueen and his wife have lived in the village of Hutton Rudby, North Yorkshire. The couple have a son and two daughters, including Hayley who is a sports journalist on Sky Sports and the Red Devils TV channel MUTV. Politically, McQueen is a Labour supporter.

In October 2011, McQueen was diagnosed with cancer of the larynx and started treatment at the James Cook University Hospital, Middlesbrough. In January 2021, McQueen was diagnosed with vascular dementia. This highlighted the issue of injuries caused to footballers by persistent heading of a ball.

Honours

Club
Leeds United
First Division: 1973–74
European Cup runner-up: 1974–75

Manchester United
FA Cup: 1982–83; runner-up: 1978–79
FA Charity Shield: 1983

Individual
PFA Team of the Year: 1974–75 First Division, 1977–78 First Division
Leeds United Player of the Year: 1974–75, 1976–77
Scottish Football Hall of Fame: 2012

Career statistics

International

International goals
Scores and results list Scotland's goal tally first.

See also
List of Scotland national football team captains

References

1952 births
Living people
People from Kilbirnie
Footballers from North Ayrshire
Scottish footballers
Scotland international footballers
Scottish football managers
1974 FIFA World Cup players
1978 FIFA World Cup players
St Mirren F.C. players
Leeds United F.C. players
Manchester United F.C. players
Seiko SA players
Middlesbrough F.C. non-playing staff
Airdrieonians F.C. (1878) managers
English Football League players
Scottish expatriate footballers
Hong Kong First Division League players
Scottish Football League managers
Scottish Football Hall of Fame inductees
Expatriate footballers in Hong Kong
Association football central defenders
People with vascular dementia
FA Cup Final players